A by-election for the seat of Wollongong in the New South Wales Legislative Assembly was held on 12 November 2016. The by-election was triggered by the resignation of Noreen Hay on 31 August.

By-elections for the seats of Canterbury and Orange were held on the same day.

Dates

Candidates
The five candidates in ballot paper order were as follows:

Results

Noreen Hay resigned.

See also
Electoral results for the district of Wollongong
List of New South Wales state by-elections

References

External links
New South Wales Electoral Commission: Wollongong State By-election
ABC Elections: Wollongong By-election

2016 elections in Australia
New South Wales state by-elections
Wollongong